Drečji Vrh (in older sources also Derečji Vrh) is a small settlement in the Municipality of Mokronog-Trebelno in southeastern Slovenia. The area is part of the historical region of Lower Carniola. The municipality is now included in the Southeast Slovenia Statistical Region. 

A number of Early Iron Age burial mounds have been identified around the settlement.

References

External links
Drečji Vrh on Geopedia

Populated places in the Municipality of Mokronog-Trebelno